Davis Idin Pareli Johansen (7 January 1926 – 28 November 2020) was a Norwegian politician. He served as the acting County Governor of Nordland county from 1991 until 1993 while Åshild Hauan was serving in the Parliament of Norway.

Johansen died on 28 November 2020, at the age of 94.

References

1926 births
2020 deaths
County governors of Nordland
County governors of Norway